Timo Teräsvirta (born January 21, 1941) is a Finnish economist. He made notable contributions in time series analysis, working with Clive Granger among others.

Teräsvirta earned his Ph.D. from the University of Helsinki in 1970, under the supervision of Leo Törnqvist.

References

External links 
 Profile at Aarhus University

1941 births
Living people
20th-century Finnish economists
University of Helsinki alumni
Academic staff of Aarhus University
Academic staff of the Stockholm School of Economics
21st-century Finnish economists